Janani is a 1993 Bengali film directed and produced by Sanat Dasgupta with a financial assistance from National Film Development Corporation of India. The film narrates the life of a little boy and his ostracized mother who is isolated from him as she is believed to be a witch in the village she lives in. It is based on a Bengali short story named Baen (Bengali: বাঁয়েন) written by the renowned Bengali author Mahasweta Devi. It was scripted by Partha Banerjee, Ashutosh Sarkar and Sanat Dasgupta himself. The music of the film was scored by Partha Sengupta. It stars Roopa Ganguly in the central role.

The film won the National Film Award for Best Film on Other Social Issues in 1993 for its delicate portrayal of an obscurantist practice like witchcraft, prevalent in certain parts of the country. The film was internationally screened under the title Mother. For its social issues, the film attracted attention at several international film festivals. It was nominated for the Crystal Globe Award but lost to Mariano Barroso's film My Soul Brother (1994). It won the Prize of the Ecumenical Jury - Special Mention at the Karlovy Vary International Film Festival, 1994. It was also screened in the category "Cinema of Today : Reflections of Our Time" at the Montreal World Film Festival, 1994. It was also screened at several other international film festivals including Cairo International Film Festival, 1994 and Dhaka International Film Festival, 1994 as closing film. The film was not theatrically released in India.

Cast 
 Roopa Ganguly
 Debesh Roy Chowdhury
 Suvojit Dasgupta
 Gyanesh Mukherjee
 Nemai Ghosh
 Ramen Roy Chowdhury
 Rajat Sen Gupta
 Simanta Chatterjee

Awards and nominations

References

Notes

External links

1993 films
Bengali-language Indian films
Best Film on Other Social Issues National Film Award winners
1990s Bengali-language films